Bevan is a name of Welsh origin, derived from ab Ifan meaning "son of Evan" (Ifan being a variant of Ieuan, the Welsh equivalent of John). Notable people with the name include:

First name
Bevan Congdon (1938–2018), New Zealand cricketer
Bevan Davies, American musician
Bevan Docherty (born 1977), New Zealand athlete
Bevan Dufty (born 1955), American politician
Bevan George (born 1977), Australian hockey player
Bevan Griggs (born 1978), New Zealand cricketer
Bevan Hari (born 1975), New Zealand hockey player
Bevan Meredith (1927–2019), Australian Anglican archbishop of Papua New Guinea
Bevan Sharpless (1904–1950), American astronomer
Bevan Slattery, Australian technology entrepreneur
Bevan Spencer von Einem (born 1946), Australian criminal

Surname
Alan Bevan, Canadian bagpipe player
Alonza Bevan (born 1970), English bass player
Aneurin "Nye" Bevan (1897–1960), British Labour Party politician
Benjamin Bevan (1773–1833), British civil engineer
Bev Bevan (born 1945), English drummer
Bill Bevan, American football player and coach
Billy Bevan, Australian film actor
Brian Bevan (1924–1991), Australian rugby player
Bridget Bevan (1698–1779), Welsh philanthropist
Christopher Bevan (born 1937), Rhodesian sailor
C. W. L. Bevan (1920–1989), Welsh chemist and academic
David Gilroy Bevan (1928–1996), English politician
Donald Bevan (1920–2013), American playwright and caricaturist
Edward Bevan (disambiguation), multiple people
 Edward Bevan (physician) (1770–1860), apiarist and physician
 Edward Bevan (bishop) (1861–1934), Bishop of Swansea and Brecon
 Edward John Bevan (1856–1921), British chemist
 Edward Vaughan Bevan (1907–1988), British doctor and Olympic rowing
Edwyn Bevan (1870–1943), English philosopher and historian
Emily Bevan (born 1982), English actress
Frederick Bevan (1856–1939), singer and songwriter in UK and teacher in South Australia
G. Phillips Bevan (1829–1889), English statistician
Gloria Bevan, New Zealand writer
Hal Bevan (1930–1968), American baseballer
Hilary Bevan Jones (born 1952), British television producer
James Bevan (1856–1938), Wales rugby union captain
James David Bevan (born 1959), British High Commissioner to India
John Bevan (disambiguation), multiple people
 John Bevan (cricketer) (1846–1918), Australian cricketer
 John Bevan (rugby) (born 1950), Welsh rugby union and rugby league player
 John Bevan (rugby union) (1948–1986), Welsh international rugby union player
 John Bevan (politician) (1837–1911), New Zealand politician
 John Bevan (British Army officer) (1894–1978), World War II deception expert
 John M. Bevan (1924–2000), American academic and innovator
 John Bevan (figure skater) (born 1976), American figure skater
 John Bevan (musician) (born 1938), English clarinettist, saxophonist, conductor
Latalia Bevan (born 2001), Welsh gymnast
Llewellyn David Bevan (1842–1918), Welsh Congregationalist minister in US and Australia
Mary Ann Bevan (1874–1933), English sideshow attraction
Matthew Bevan (born 1973), British criminal
Maurice Bevan (1921–2006), British baritone and composer
Michael Bevan (born 1970), Australian cricketer
Myer Bevan (born 1997), New Zealand footballer
Natalie Bevan (1909–2007), British artist
Nick Bevan (1942–2014), British rowing coach and school headmaster
Paul Bevan (born 1984), Australian footballer
R. A. Bevan (1901–1974), advertising pioneer
Robert Polhill Bevan (1865–1925), artist, father of R. A. Bevan
Scott Bevan (born 1979), English footballer
Scott Bevan (journalist) (born 1964), Australian journalist
Sid Bevan (1877–1933), Wales and British Lions rugby union player
Silvanus Bevan (1691–1765), Welsh apothecary
Stewart Bevan (1948–2022), British actor
Thomas Bevan (cricketer) (1900–1942), English cricketer and British Army officer
Tim Bevan (born 1958), New Zealand film producer
Tony Bevan (painter) (born 1951), painter
Vince Bevan, Canadian policeman
William Bevan aka Burial (musician), English electronic musician.
William Bevan (sloopmaster), Hudson's Bay Company explorer
William Bevan (psychologist), a former president of the American Psychological Association
Wilson Lloyd Bevan (1866–1935), an American historian

See also
 Bevan, Ohio
, see List of Liberty ships (S–Z)

 Beavan
 Bevin (disambiguation)
 Bevins
 Bevanism

English-language surnames
Surnames of Welsh origin
Anglicised Welsh-language surnames
Patronymic surnames
Surnames from given names